Elections to Cannock Chase District Council took place on 22 May 2014 on the same day as other local elections in England and the European Parliament elections. A third of the council was up for election, meaning a total of 13 councillors were elected from all but two of the council's wards. There were no elections held in the Hagley or Hednesford South wards as those wards elect only two councillors in the other two years of the election cycle.

The Labour Party held control of the council and increased its majority by one compared with the previous election when it had gained the council from no overall control. Notably, UKIP came a close second and gained four seats, despite not previously contesting an election in the district; a subsequent Conservative defection shortly after the election saw them assume the status of official opposition party. Compared with the results of the 2010 election when these seats were last up for election, Labour's vote share decreased slightly but they gained one seat from the Conservatives whilst UKIP gained three seats from the Conservatives and one from the Liberal Democrats. This left the Conservatives and Lib Dems, who had previously won eight seats between them and run the council in a coalition, winning just one seat each.

Results

|}

Council Composition
Prior to the election, the composition of the council was:

After the election, the composition of the council was:

Ward results
Vote share changes are based on the results achieved by parties in 2010 when these seats were last contested.

Brereton and Ravenhill

^ Linda Whitehouse was the sitting councillor for the Rawnsley ward and previously defected from the Conservatives to UKIP.

Cannock East

Cannock North

Cannock South

Cannock West

Etching Hill and the Heath

Hawks Green

Heath Hayes East and Wimblebury

Hednesford Green Heath

Hednesford North

Norton Canes

Rawnsley

Western Springs

^ Mike Grocott was re-elected as the councillor for the Western Springs ward after he had previously left the Liberal Democrats to become an independent.

References

2014
2014 English local elections
2010s in Staffordshire